Richard "Dickie" Rooks (born 29 May 1940) is a former English footballer who played as a centre half. He made over 260 Football League appearances in the years after the Second World War.

Career
Rooks played locally for Sunderland youth teams. Rooks signed professional in June 1957 for Sunderland. Rooks moved from Sunderland for £20,000 to Middlesbrough in August 1965. Alan Dicks signed Rooks for £17,000 in June 1969 for Bristol City.

Rooks left Bristol City in July 1972 to become the player coach at Willington. Rooks then joined Scunthorpe United in November 1974 as manager for 14 months before being sacked in January 1976. Scunthorpe United had finished 24th and bottom of the Fourth Division in 1974-75 and been forced to seek re-election. Rooks then coached Zanzibar and was an FA Coach for Tyne & Wear linked to Sunderland's School of Excellence.

When Rooks retired from football he became a self-employed builder in his home town Sunderland.

Honours
with Middlesbrough
Football League Third Division runners up: 1966–67

References

1940 births
Living people
Footballers from Sunderland
English footballers
Association football defenders
English Football League players
Southern Football League players
Sunderland A.F.C. players
Middlesbrough F.C. players
Bristol City F.C. players
Willington A.F.C. players
Scunthorpe United F.C. managers
English football managers